Gandzak is a village in the Gavar Municipality of the Gegharkunik Province of Armenia. The village is located on the eastern side of the Gavar river, 3 km southwest from the regional center Gavar, at an average height of 1,980 meters above sea level.

Etymology 
The village was previously known as Batikian and Batikyan, in honor of Batik Batikian (1892–1920), a Communist activist.

History 
The village contains the 4th- or 5th-century half-ruined basilica of St. Astvatsatsin, and the domed 9th- or 10th-century St. Gevorg Church, in ancient times it had a domed hall. In the 19th century, Armenian migrants from Western Armenia covered the destroyed roofs with the logs.

Gallery

References

External links 

 
 

Populated places in Gegharkunik Province